Sinoy Joseph (born 31 July 1981) is an Indian film sound mixer and sound designer. He won the 60th National Film Awards for the best Re-recordist of the Final Mixed Track for the film Gangs of Wasseypur. He also won the best sound mixing at the 49th Kerala State Film Awards for the Film Carbon. He has worked on more than 350 feature films in almost 20 languages, which includes English, Hindi, Malayalam, Tamil and Marathi cinemas.

Early life
Joseph was born into a middle-class family in Kudavechoor near Vaikom in Kottayam, Kerala. He was the youngest of four children. His father worked as a school teacher at St. Michael's HSS, Kudavechoor. Sinoy did his schooling in the same school. Apart from his studies, Sinoy was active in other extracurricular activities which included painting, singing and, dancing. He was conferred with the Kalaprathibha in the Kerala Sub-District Youth Festival for three years. He went to St. Xaviers College, Kothavara Vaikom to pursue his pre-degree. He earned a bachelor's degree in Electronics and Computer Hardware from Mahatma Gandhi University, Kerala.

Career

Sinoy moved to Mumbai in 2005. He started his career as a recordist in Quality Cine Labs, Mumbai. After a few months of working he got an opportunity to work as Assistant Re-Recording Mixer under Pramod Thomas and Deepan Chatterji. He became an independent Re-Recording Sound Mixer in the year of 2008. Within three years, he became widely recognized in the Bollywood film industry as a Sound Re-recordist in the Indian film industry. He won the 60th National Film Awards for the best Re-recordist of the Final Mixed Track for the film Gangs of Wasseypur in 2012. He has worked on more than 350 feature films in almost 20 languages in a span of 10 years of his career till date. His major works include English Vinglish, Piku, Pink, Nanban, Lai Bhaari, Rajkahini, Masaan, Sairat, Trapped, Carbon, October, and Neerali.

Personal life
He is married to Asha Sinoy. They have two daughters.

Filmography

References

External links
 

1981 births
Living people
Musicians from Kottayam
Indian sound designers
Best Audiography National Film Award winners
Mahatma Gandhi University, Kerala alumni